The Epps 1911 Monoplane was designed and built in 1911 by Ben T. Epps from Athens, Georgia.

1910s United States experimental aircraft
Aircraft first flown in 1911